Christo 'Doppies' le Roux (born 28 March 1985, Bloemfontein) is a former South African rugby union footballer. His regular playing position is either flanker or eighthman. He represented the Lions in Super Rugby and the Pumas in the Currie Cup and Vodacom Cup.

He retired at the end of the 2014 season to focus on his engineering career.

References

External links

itsrugby.co.uk profile

1985 births
Living people
Lions (United Rugby Championship) players
North-West University alumni
Pumas (Currie Cup) players
Rugby union flankers
Rugby union players from Bloemfontein
South African rugby union players
SWD Eagles players
White South African people